Durkee is an American brand of spices, marinades, and powdered sauce mixes owned by B&G Foods. Durkee Famous Foods was established  by Eugene R. Durkee in 1851.

History 
Durkee's was established by Eugene R. Durkee, the founder of E. R. Durkee & Co. Spice dealers in Buffalo, New York, in 1857. By 1917, the company had built a four-story industrial structure in Elmhurst, Queens. As of 2021, the company has a major production facility in Ankeny, Iowa. Which is the actual home of what was Tone Brothers Spices (Owned by Rykoff Sexton at that time) Currently owned by B&G Foods who own Durkee brand.  

Durkee becomes the largest factory and employer in Elmhurst, with over 300 employees, primarily women. E.R. Durkee died in 1926, leaving everything to his daughters. Since the 1980s the company has had a series of owners, and in 2016 it was sold by ACH Food Companies, a subsidiary of Associated British Foods, to B&G Foods.

Glidden Co. purchased the firm in 1929, and it became Durkee's Famous Foods, a division of Glidden Co. Glidden merged with SCM Corp (formerly Smith-Corona company) in 1967, and Durkee became the Glidden-Durkee Division of SCM.

The Company was sold in 1986 and was subsequently absorbed into a larger-food processing conglomerate. In 2007, the building was renovated and became the Elmhurst Educational Campus, which hosts three separate high schools.

The company's Durkee Sauce is sold at Court Street Grocers in Brooklyn and served on their Turkey + Durkee sandwich in the "mustardy, vinegary, mayonnaise-based" sauce concoction.

References

External links
 

American brands
Brand name condiments